Mike Hyndman (born December 8, 1945, in Quebec City, Quebec) is a Canadian former ice hockey right winger who played in the World Hockey Association for the New England Whalers and the Los Angeles Sharks.

Hyndman spent two seasons in the Ontario Hockey Association with the Montreal Junior Canadiens before spending three seasons with Boston University.  He turned pro in 1970 in the American Hockey League for the Montreal Voyageurs and then played for the Boston Braves in the same league in 1971.  He split the 1972–73 season in the World Hockey Association for the New England Whalers and the Los Angeles Sharks, playing 59 games for the Whalers and 19 games for the Sharks. Spells in the Southern Hockey League for the Greensboro Generals and in the Western Hockey League for the Phoenix Roadrunners was followed with eight more games for the Los Angeles Shark during the 1973–74 season.  After one season in the North American Hockey League for the Cape Codders, Hyndman finished his career in Europe with spells in Finland and Austria.

Awards and honors

External links

1945 births
Living people
Boston Braves (AHL) players
Boston University Terriers men's ice hockey players
Canadian ice hockey right wingers
Cape Codders players
Greensboro Generals (SHL) players
Los Angeles Sharks players
Montreal Junior Canadiens players
Montreal Voyageurs players
New England Whalers players
Phoenix Roadrunners (WHL) players
Ice hockey people from Quebec City
Canadian expatriate ice hockey players in the United States
AHCA Division I men's ice hockey All-Americans